KHMU (100.9 FM) is a class A radio station broadcasting out of Buttonwillow, California.

History
KHMU began broadcasting on February 18, 2015.

References

External links
 

Mass media in Kern County, California
Radio stations established in 2015
HMU
2015 establishments in California